Cerithiopsidae is a family of very small sea snails in the informal group Ptenoglossa. Members of this family are known as cerithiopsids.

These tiny snails have shells that are very high-spired and consist of multiple whorls.

Subfamilies
The following subfamilies were recognized in the taxonomy of Bouchet & Rocroi (2005):
 Aliptinae 
 Cerithiopsinae 
 Seilinae

Genera

, the following genera are included in the family Cerithiopsidae:

Genera brought into synonymy
 Australopsis Cecalupo & Perugia, 2014: synonym of Oparopsis Cecalupo & Perugia, 2015 (invalid: junior homonym of Australopsis Hinz-Schallreuter, 1993 [Ostracoda]; Oparopsis is a replacement name)
 Callisteuma Tomlin, 1929: synonym of Granulopsis Cecalupo & Perugia, 2012 (invalid: junior homonym of Callisteuma Prout, 1912 [Lepidoptera]; Granulopsis is a replacement name)
 Cinctella Monterosato, 1884: synonym of Seila A. Adams, 1861
 Conciliopsis Laseron, 1956: synonym of Cerithiopsis Forbes & Hanley, 1850
 Granulotriforis Kosuge, 1967: synonym of Trituba (Granulotriforis) Kosuge, 1967 represented as Trituba Jousseaume, 1884
 Hebeseila Finlay, 1926: synonym of Seila (Hebeseila) Finlay, 1926 represented as Seila A. Adams, 1861
 Lyroseila Finlay, 1928: synonym of Seila (Lyroseila) Finlay, 1928 represented as Seila A. Adams, 1861
 Nanopsis Cecalupo & Robba, 2010: synonym of Costulopsis Cecalupo & Robba, 2019 (invalid: junior homonym of Nanopsis Henningsmoen, 1954 [Ostracoda]; Costulopsis is a replacement name)
 Notoseila Finlay, 1926: synonym of Seila (Notoseila) Finlay, 1926 represented as Seila A. Adams, 1861
 † Tembrockia Gründel, 1980 : synonym of † Thereitis Le Renard, 1998  (preoccupied by Tembrockia Glibert & van de Poel, 1967 (Bivalvia); Thereitis Le Renard, 1998 is a replacement name)

References

External links

 BA Marshall, Cerithiopsidae (Mollusca: Gastropoda) of New Zealand, and a provisional classification of the family; New Zealand journal of zoology, 1978
 Miocene Gastropods and Biostratigraphy of the Kern River Area, California; United States Geological Survey Professional Paper 642